Batikam Stone is a historical heritage object in Jorong Dusun Tuo, Nagari Limo Kaum, Tanah Datar Regency, on Sumatra in Indonesia. Translated from Indonesian, Batu Batikam means the stone that getting stabbed. 

According to the history, the hole that in the middle of the stone come from stocked of Datuak Parpatiah Nan Sabatang.). The large of this culture, Batikam Stone, is, 1.800 meters, long time ago it was used as "medan nan bapaneh" or called as the place of the leader to take decision. the formation of the stones around Batikam stone like back of chairs, it look like a square. in the middle, there is Batikam stone of Andes rocks. This stones' size is about 55 x 20 x 40 centimeters, with the shape looks like triangle. Batikam stone becomes one of evidence about the existence of Minangkabau kingdom in neolithic era. Batikam stone is the stone that stocked which symbolize the important thing peace and discussion on Minangkabau society.

References 

Sumatra
Inscriptions
Sacred rocks